The 2018 Afghan Premier League is the seventh season of Afghan Premier League, the Afghan league for association football clubs, since its establishment in 2012. The season was initially postponed due to lack of funding, but was later revived after securing new sponsors.

The season began on the 7th of October, 2018. Shaheen Asmayee were the two-time defending champions and reached the final of the 2018 Afghan Premier League. Toofaan Harirod became the champions for the second time in their history by winning the final via extra time, 1–0.

Teams
The following eight teams, which represent the country's eight main regions, participated in the 2018 Afghan Premier League.
De Abasin Sape
De Maiwand Atalan
De Spin Ghar Bazan
Mawjhal Amu
Oqaban Hindukush
Shaheen Asmayee
Simorgh Alborz
Toofaan Harirod

Group stage
The draw for the group stage was held on 1 October 2018.

Group A

Group B

Semi finals

Final

References

External links

Afghan Premier League seasons
Afghanistan
2018 in Afghan football